Bilaspuri, or Kahluri (Takri:) is a language spoken in northern India, predominantly in the Bilaspur district of Himachal Pradesh. It is associated with the people of the former princely state of Bilaspur in the Panjab Hills.

Bilaspuri is classified as one of the varieties of the Western Pahari language group. However, Bilaspuri is listed as Punjabi in the census. According to the 2011 Census, the speakers of Bilaspuri/Kahluri are 295,805.

The dialect of the hilly part of Hoshiarpur district is also known as Pahāṛī.

Dialects 
Following are the five dialects of Bilaspuri:

 North-east Bilaspuri (north-east of Kumar Hati); resemblance with Mandeali.
 North Bilaspuri (north of Kumar Hati); resemblance with Mandeali.
 West Bilaspuri: has the maximum Punjabi words of all Kahluri dialects.
 Central Bilaspuri: Bilaspur (historic) town and surrounding area; shares resemblance to Punjabi.
 Davin or Daur: east and south-east of Bilaspur (historic) town.

The dialects of Kahluri are so closely allied that one might call them one dialect Kahluri or Bilaspuri.

Writing system 
The native script of the language is Takri script.

Proverbs

Status 
The language is commonly called Pahari or Himachali. Before independence there were certain institutions which enjoyed states patronage to publish in Kahluri. All of these institutions today lie in ruins since independence to favour Hindi. With no institute that imparts teaching for this language, the language/dialect is endangered due to dominance of other recognised languages like Standard Punjabi or Hindi.

The demand for the inclusion of 'Pahari (Himachali)' under the Eight Schedule of the Constitution, which is supposed to represent multiple Pahari languages of Himachal Pradesh, had been made in the year 2010 by the state's Vidhan Sabha. There has been no positive progress on this matter since then even when small organisations are striving to save the language. Due to political interest, the language is currently recorded as a dialect of Punjabi, which was done on the basis of the conclusion made by G.A. Grierson who said Kahluri to be a 'rude' version of Punjabi. Since then linguists have changed this conclusion and have established it to be much more closer to others dialects of Western Pahari.

References

External links
 Singh, Amitjit.  "The Language Divide in Punjab." Sagar, Volume 4, Number 1, Spring 1997.

Indo-Aryan languages
Northern Indo-Aryan languages
Languages of Himachal Pradesh
Bilaspur district, Himachal Pradesh
Rupnagar district
Endangered languages of India